Forgotten Realms: Demon Stone is a video game that was released in 2004 for PlayStation 2, Xbox and Windows PC. It is set in the Forgotten Realms campaign setting for Dungeons & Dragons (D&D). The story was written by R.A. Salvatore and features the voices of Patrick Stewart as Khelben "Blackstaff" Arunsun and Michael Clarke Duncan as Ygorl.

Synopsis

Characters and setting 

There are three playable characters in Forgotten Realms: Demon Stone, each with his or her own unique abilities: the fighter Rannek, is a master of melee combat; the sorcerer Illius, can cast spells over long range; and a half-drow, half-wood-elf rogue named Zhai easily vanishes into the shadows before sneaking up on her enemy for the kill.

The two villains are equally enemies of the heroes and of each other. The first villain—Ygorl—is the leader of the Slaad army. Cireka, general of the Githyanki, is the second. The game's introduction explains that the only thing keeping each of them from taking over the realm is their hatred of each other. Fearing that the realm would be at the mercy of whichever villain was victorious, the great mage Khelben Blackstaff sealed them both within a Demon Stone.

The story develops as the three heroes battle two orc armies near the jewel-rich Gemspark Mines. A great red dragon, sent by Ygorl, leads the group to these mines. Once there, they unwittingly release Ygorl and Cireka from the Demon Stone and into the world. The three heroes must undo their mistake by joining forces to right the wrong they caused.

Story 

R.A. Salvatore wrote the game's script, which begins with Rannek, a human fighter, stumbling across a battle between two orc armies. As he comes to the aid of wood elves captured by the orcs, a half-drow, half-elf named Zhai and a sorcerer named Illius join the battle. Ultimately, Rannek, Zhai, and Illius are driven into the nearby Gemspark Mines by a dragon, Caminus. Inside the mines, they accidentally release the warlords Ygorl and Cireka from their imprisonment in a Demon Stone. The three escape from the warlords and decide to join forces to imprison them again.

After evacuating the nearby wood-elf village of Cedarleaf, attacked by Cireka and her Githyanki soldiers, they visit Illius' mentor, Khelben Blackstaff, for advice. He says that they will need a new Demon Stone; one could be found in the possession of the Yuan-ti people. As the three leave, Ygorl arrives riding Caminus and attacks Khelben's tower. The tower is destroyed as the three escape.

After they defeat the Yuan-ti and claim the Demon Stone, they go to see Drizzt Do'Urden, a drow that does not follow the normally cruel ways of his people, hoping he can help them find Cireka. He directs them to an abandoned portal in the Underdark, as that would be where she would feel most comfortable. When they find the portal, they also find Cireka and her Githyanki horde ready to make use of it. As the three battle the Githyanki, Ygorl arrives with his Slaad horde. Illius tries to imprison the two warlords in the Demon Stone, but Ygorl forces himself and Cireka through the portal before Illius can succeed. The three follow the warlords through the portal to the lair of Caminus. There, Cireka is killed by the dragon, and Ygorl flees through another portal. The three work together to slay Caminus, then pursue Ygorl through the portal.

The portal takes them back to Gemspark Mines. After fighting their way past Ygorl's hoard, they use a portal that leads to Limbo, where Ygorl waits for them. There, the heroes engage in a final duel with Ygorl, ultimately slaying him. They are welcomed back at Cedarleaf as heroes. Here, Khelben Blackstaff arrives through a portal, having survived the assault on his tower. He brings them the king's thanks and the offer of the untamed land of Vaasa to be their own, he also mentions that the Githyanki would aim to retrieve the "Silver Sword", previously owned by Cireka, as it is an ancient artifact. However, Rannek concludes by saying: "Let them try".

Gameplay 

Players have control over all three characters and can change character at any time (after all three main heroes arrive). There are many fighting moves, and players must use each character's skills to play the game effectively. Rannek uses a sword and breaks things with his gauntlets. Illius fights with a staff and uses magic (the game's most powerful ranged attack; the other two can throw knives (Zhai) or axes (Rannek)). Zhai uses two daggers and becomes invisible in shadows—this is useful for sneaking up on enemies and killing them. Bosses overpower characters in one-on-one fighting but can be defeated with the combined power of all three heroes. Although much of the game is hack-and-slash, there are several tasks that require the use of various skills.

Cast
 Cireka, voiced by B.J. Ward
 Drizzt, voiced by Robin Atkin Downes
 Illius, voiced by Christopher Nissley
 Khelben, voiced by Patrick Stewart
 Rannek, voiced by Dan Riordan
 Ygorl, voiced by Michael Clarke Duncan
 Zhai, voiced by Vanessa Marshall

Critical reception 

The game received a positive response from critics.  Heather Newman of the Detroit Free Press called the game "extraordinarily cinematic", adding that "the dialogue and story line Salvatore crafted substantially contributed to that feel". Judy Siegel-Itzkovich of the Jerusalem Post gave the game four and half stars. She praised the graphics as "excellent", and the sound, calling the music "rousing and dramatic", the voice acting "high quality", and the sound effects "highly realistic". She concluded by saying that while fans would love the game, it is too short and the hack and slash element becomes "repetitive".

Demon Stone was nominated for two awards by the British Academy of Film and Television Arts (BAFTA), and four awards by the Academy of Interactive Arts & Sciences.

Notes

References

External links 

 

2004 video games
Action video games
Atari games
Forgotten Realms video games
Orcs in popular culture
PlayStation 2 games
Role-playing video games
Single-player video games
Stormfront Studios games
Video games developed in the United States
Windows games
Xbox games